Angry Guest or E ke is a 1972 Shaw Brothers film directed by Chang Cheh from Hong Kong, starring David Chiang and Ti Lung, it is a sequel to Duel of Fists.

Synopsis

Fan Ke (David Chiang) and Wenlie (Ti Lung) are back, and this time they're up against a powerful Japanese crime syndicate (headed by director Chang Cheh, himself). Not only that, but Killer (Chan Sing), the head villain from "Duel of Fists," has escaped prison and wants retribution. Killer's revenge plot leads to Wenlie's girlfriend's kidnapping, and forces the two heroes to travel to Japan to set things straight and kick some ass.

Plot 
 
In Thailand, an architect and his brother capture a gangster wanted by the authorities, a ruthless man named Killer. However he escapes from prison and seeks revenge by killing the brother's family and holding his girlfriend hostage in Japan. Although they catch up with him, they are blackmailed in that if they don't let Killer free, the girlfriend will be killed. Soon after arriving in Japan they are helped by a rival veteran crime boss who wants to oust Killer the gangster for good and dominate his operations.

It leads to a climax scene where Killer's gang are invaded on a construction site, complete with diggers and machinery used in the battle.

References

External links 
 

1972 films
Hong Kong martial arts films
Kung fu films
Shaw Brothers Studio films
Films directed by Chang Cheh
1970s Hong Kong films